The first government of Iraq led by Prime Minister Nouri al-Maliki took office on May 20, 2006 following approval by the members of the Iraqi National Assembly. This followed the general election in December 2005. The government succeeded the Iraqi Transitional Government which had continued in office in a caretaker capacity until the new government was formed and confirmed. 

This Al Maliki I Government governed Iraq until 2010, to be succeeded by the Al Maliki II Government (Dec. 2010 - Sept 2014).

Process of formation

After some disputes over the election results, the members of the new Council of Representatives were sworn in on March 16, 2006. In the meantime, negotiations over the forming of a government had begun. Leaders of the four largest political groupings called for a government of national unity. Although it was decided in advance that the largest grouping (the United Iraqi Alliance) would name the Prime Minister, this decision would prove to be hot matter, both within the Alliance and in the negotiations with other groupings, who rejected the first nominee, incumbent Prime Minister Ibrahim al-Jaafari. Finally the Alliance reached a decision to nominate Nouri al-Maliki to the post.

No-confidence moves
In December 2006, media reported a plot to oust Maliki in a no-confidence vote and to create a new governmental alliance between SCIRI, UIA independents, the Kurdistani Alliance and Iraqi Islamic Party. Adil Abdul Mahdi had been proposed as the new Prime Minister, but SCIRI MP Hameed Maalah was quoted saying the groups hadn't yet agreed on a new leader. A Maliki aide confirmed the plot but said they intended to sabotage it. A no-confidence vote would require a simple majority but a new Prime Minister would require a two-thirds majority.

Agenda
The following matters were expected to be the most important issues for the new government to deal with:

 The relationship with the United States and coalition forces
 Containing the insurgency and inter-communal violence
 Implementing and possibly amending the constitution, particularly with regards federalism.*

Federalism and the Constitution

One of the main areas faced by the new government was the issue of federalism, which includes the formation of one or more Shi'ite regions, the status of Kirkuk and any possible amendment to the Constitution of Iraq

Constitutional amendments 

Under a compromise agreed in September 2005 between the United Iraqi Alliance, Democratic Patriotic Alliance of Kurdistan and Iraqi Islamic Party, the new Assembly would consider amendments to the constitution in its first four months. Following this compromise the Iraqi Islamic Party agreed to back the constitution in the referendum.  A constitutional revision committee was eventually formed under the new parliament, which issued an incomplete report in 2007.  Despite widespread agreement amongst a majority of parties in Iraq that the text is in need of revision, partly in order to clarify some technical issues but also in part in order to bring the constitution more closely in line with the Iraqi mainstream, the constitutional revision process has not made any progress through parliament since 2007.

Federalism 
Article 114 of the constitution of Iraq provided that no new region may be created before the Iraqi National Assembly has passed a law which provides the procedures for forming the region. This law was passed on 11 October  after an agreement was reached with the Iraqi Accord Front to form the constitutional review committee and to defer implementation of the law for 18 months. Legislators from the Iraqi Accord Front, Sadrist Movement and Islamic Virtue Party all opposed the bill.

Governorate elections 

Interim councils were elected in each of the Governorates of Iraq in the Iraqi Governorate elections of 2005. One of the tasks of the government was to pass a law to regulate the powers of the governorates and the process of elections. The law was finally passed by the Council of Representatives of Iraq in February 2008. It was vetoed by the Presidency Council at first, on the grounds that giving the Prime Minister the power to dismiss Governors would contravene the constitution. However, the Council reversed its position following protests from the Sadrist Movement, saying they would seek changes to the law before it came into force.

Kirkuk 

Meanwhile, the Kurdistan Alliance wants Kurds who were expelled from Kirkuk to be allowed to return to the city and for the Kurdistan Region to be expanded. This currently includes the governorates of As-Sulaymāniyyah, Arbīl and Dahūk, and the Kurds would like this expanded to include Kirkuk and parts or all of Diyala and Ninawa. However, this move is opposed by Turkmen and Arabs in Kirkuk and by neighbouring Turkey. The Iraqi newspaper, 'Al-Furat, reported 2006-03-05 that this is also opposed by Jaafari, and one of the reasons why the Kurds opposed his nomination. The al-Maliki government announced in its programme that the referendum to determine Kirkuk's status would be held on 15 November 2007.

The Kurds would also like to increase the proportion of oil revenues retained by the regions from 17% to 24%.

In August 2006 Maliki appointed a committee to "examine the status" of Kirkuk "in light of Iraq's federalist system", headed by the Sunni Arab Justice Minister Hashim al-Shibli. The committee also including the Shi'ite Independent Interior Minister Jawad Bulani, the Turkoman Youth Minister Jasim Mohammed Jaafar and four representatives from Kirkuk.

Issues faced by the government

Basra violence 
As soon as the government was formed members of the Basrah-based Islamic Virtue Party started a "go-slow", annoyed that they had lost their control over the oil ministry. A state of emergency was imposed on June 2 and the Iraqi Army stationed at key positions. A provincial security council was appointed by Prime Minister Maliki, consisting of:
 Safa al-Safi, Ministry of State for Parliamentary Affairs
 Salam al-Maliki, Sadr Movement
 Hadi Al-Amiri, Badr Organization
 Islamic Virtue Party representative
 Iraqi Accord Front representative
 three other United Iraqi Alliance members

Prison Abuse
D+Z, a development magazine based in Germany, reports the current administration reverting to Saddam-era police tactics, including torture and extrajudicial executions. It is reported that Prime Minister Nouri al-Maliki knew of these acts, but he claims "the stories are 'lies.'" Reports of secret prisons exist as well.

Key legislation passed 
The government passed the following key items of legislation:

 The Federalism Law (October 2006), which provided for the formation of new Regions of Iraq
 The Unified Retirement Law (October 2007), restored pensions to former Baathists
 The Accountability and Justice Law (January 2008), also known as the de-Baathification reforms, reinstated jobs and pensions to low-ranking Baath Party members, made the De-Baathification Commission permanent and extended de-Baathification to the judiciary.  The law was passed by a majority vote by the Presidency Council after Vice President Tariq al-Hashimi refused to sign.
 The General Amnesty Law (February 2008) allowed for the pardoning and release of all prisoners detained for more than 6 months without charge or 12 months without trial, unless suspected of the most serious crimes.
 The Provincial Powers Act (February 2008) was passed by a majority of only 1 and detailed the division of powers between Governorates of Iraq and the federal government. The law gave the Prime Minister the power to dismiss governors. However, the Presidency Council vetoed this law, saying it violated the constitutions provisions on the powers of the governorates. It also provided for a Provincial Elections Law, to be passed within 90 days and new elections to be held by October 2008.

References

External links
 Official site (Arabic)
 Republic of Iraq Ministry of Foreign Affairs
 Kurdistan Regional Government 
 Biographies of members of Iraq's government (20 July 2006)

2006 establishments in Iraq
2010 disestablishments in Iraq